"Whatever" is a 2013 single by German rapper Cro and his first single that topped the German singles chart. The lighthearted song was very popular in the German market, receiving upwards of 40 million views on YouTube as of July 2016. Released on 28 June 2013, it is his sixth single and is found on the 2013 EP Whatever.

Track listing
Maxi single
"Whatever" (3:11)
"Whatever" (instrumental) (3:11)
Whatever EP
"Whatever" (3:11)
"Chillin" (4:32)
"Bei dir" (2:20)
"Ab jetzt" (2:49)

Charts

Weekly charts

Year-end charts

Certifications

References

2012 songs
2013 singles
Cro (rapper) songs
Number-one singles in Germany
German-language songs